Sh! The Octopus is a 1937 comedy-mystery film produced by Warner Bros., directed by William McGann and starring Hugh Herbert, Allen Jenkins and Marcia Ralston. While contract players Herbert and Jenkins frequently appeared in the same picture, this is the only movie to present them as an actual team. The film's oddball qualities have made it something of a cult favorite.

Premise
Herbert and Jenkins play two bumbling detectives, who, in pursuit of a master criminal, The Octopus, find themselves inside a haunted lighthouse full of suspicious characters, including the titular character, who appears to be an actual octopus.

Cast
Hugh Herbert as Kelly 
Allen Jenkins as Dempsey 
Marcia Ralston as Vesta Vernoff  
John Eldredge as Paul Morgan 
George Rosener as Captain Hook 
Margaret Irving as Polly Crane
Elspeth Dudgeon as Nanny 
Lew Harvey as Sinister plotter  
Frank Hagney as Sinister plotter 
Ed Biby as Sinister plotter   
Molly Doyle as Nurse
Jack Jorgensen as Sinister plotter

Other media
In 2010, the film was released by Warner Archive as part of the six-film DVD-R collection Warner Bros. Horror/Mystery Double Features.

It also airs occasionally on Turner Classic Movies.

References

1937 films
1930s comedy horror films
American black-and-white films
American comedy horror films
American detective films
American films based on plays
1930s comedy mystery films
American haunted house films
Warner Bros. films
Works set in lighthouses
American comedy mystery films
1937 comedy films
Films directed by William C. McGann
1930s English-language films
1930s American films